Dirt Lodge Creek is a stream in the U.S. state of South Dakota. It was named for an Indian settlement along its course which contained earthen floors.

See also
List of rivers of South Dakota

References

Rivers of Corson County, South Dakota
Rivers of South Dakota